The Remix Album...Diamonds Are Forever is a remix album by Welsh singer Shirley Bassey, released in 2000. It contains some of Bassey's most popular songs, along with lesser-known Bassey tracks, remixed by contemporary DJs and producers such as Kenny "Dope" Gonzalez, Kurtis Mantronik, Nightmares on Wax, Groove Armada, Mark Brydon from Moloko (under the alias DJ Skymoo), and Propellerheads, who had collaborated with Bassey three years earlier on their single, "History Repeating".

The awayTEAM remix of Bassey's 1971 hit, "Where Do I Begin", was released as a single, reaching number 100 in the UK Singles Chart in 2000.

Critical reception

In a review for AllMusic, Mark Keresman gave The Remix Album...Diamonds Are Forever two out of five stars, writing that the album "is not for old-school fans of unadulterated Bassey, but club denizens will find a lot to groove to here."

Track listing

Personnel
Musicians (track 1)
Andrew Currie – trombone
Simon Currie – saxophone
John Hoare – trumpet
Denny Ilett – horn arrangement
Andrew Kremer – double bass
Duncan McNaughton – trumpet
Ian Smith – trumpet
Martyn Sumner – trombone
Mike Wills – saxophone

Production
Ralph Alfonso – US design
AP – art direction & design
awayTEAM – remix & additional production (track 1)
Steven Barkan – mix engineer (track 3)
Mark Brydon – remix (track 10)
Albert Cabrera – edits (track 4)
DJ E.A.S.E. – additional production (track 5)
DJ Spinna – remix (track 8)
Kenny "Dope" Gonzalez – re-edit (track 3)
Groove Armada – remix & additional production (track 6)
Andrew Heermans – mixer (track 4)
Jak – engineer and remixer (track 9)
Kurtis Mantronik – producer, mixer (track 4)
Ciara Nolan – project manager, cover image design
Propellerheads – remix & additional production (track 2)
Oscar Ramirez – assistant engineer (track 3)
Nick Robinson – A&R
Wild Oscar – remix & additional production (track 7)
Bram Ttwheam – cover image design
Robin Twelftree – remix & additional production (track 9)
Bruce Wood – engineer (track 5)

Charts

References

External links
The Remix Album...Diamonds Are Forever at Discogs
The Remix Album...Diamonds Are Forever (US version) at Discogs

Shirley Bassey albums
2000 remix albums
EMI Records remix albums
Nettwerk Records remix albums